The Aras (also known as the Araks, Arax, Araxes, or Araz) is a river in the Caucasus. It rises in eastern Turkey and flows along the borders between Turkey and Armenia, between Turkey and the Nakhchivan exclave of Azerbaijan, between Iran and both Azerbaijan and Armenia, and, finally, through Azerbaijan where it flows into the Kura river. It drains the south side of the Lesser Caucasus Mountains while the Kura drains the north side of the Lesser Caucasus. The Aras is one of the longest rivers in the Caucasus.

Names
In classical antiquity, the river was known to the Greeks as Araxes. Its modern Armenian name is Arax or Araks. Historically it was also known as Yeraskh and its Old Georgian name is Rakhsi. In Azerbaijani, the river's name is Araz.

Geography
The Aras rises near Erzurum in Turkey and meets with the Akhuryan River southeast of Digor. From Digor it flows along the Armenia–Turkey border and then runs close to the corridor that connects Turkey to Azerbaijan's Nakhchivan exclave. It then continues along the Iranian-Armenian and the Iranian-Azerbaijan border.

Tributaries

The following rivers are tributaries of the Aras, from source to mouth:

Akhuryan (left)
Metsamor (left)
Hrazdan (left)
Azat (left)
Vedi (left)
Arpa (left)
Zangmar (right)
Naxçıvançay (left)
Qatur (right)
Hajilarchay (right)
Meghri (left)
Bəsitçay (left)
Voghji (left)
Kaleybarchay (right)
Hakari (left)
Qarasu/Dareh-Rud (right)
Köndələnçay (left)

Etymology and history

In Armenian tradition, the river is named after Arast, a great-grandson of the legendary Armenian patriarch Haik. The name was later Hellenized to Araxes and was applied to the Kura-Araxes culture, a prehistoric people who flourished in the valleys of the Kura and Aras. The river is also mentioned in the last chapter of Virgil's Aeneid VIII, as "angry at the bridge," since the Romans built a bridge over it, so that it is thereby conquered. The river Aras has been associated with the biblical rivers Gihon and Pishon. Robert H. Hewsen described Aras as the only "true river" of Armenia and as "Mother Araxes," a symbol of pride to the Armenian people.

According to a legend cited by Strabo, in ancient times, the Araxes river in Armenia had no outflow to the Caspian Sea, but spread out in plains and created a lake without outflow.

In Islamic times, the Araxes became known in Arabic parlance as al-Rass (not to be confused with modern-day Ar Rass) and in Perso-Turkish contexts as Aras.

In modern history, the Aras gained significance as a geographic political boundary. Under the terms of the Treaty of Gulistan and the Treaty of Turkmenchay, the river was chosen as the border limit between the Russian Empire and Qajar Iran, as the latter was forced to cede its Caucasian territories to Russia. Because of these 19th-century border changes, one modern, not widely accepted scheme draws Aras River as the line of continental demarcation between Europe and Asia.

Iran and the Soviet Union have built the Aras Dam on the Aras in the Poldasht area in the 20th century, creating the Aras Reservoir. The Meghri Dam is under construction near the Armenian town of Meghri.

Aras Valley
In 2006, a bird research and education center was established by KuzeyDoğa, a Turkish non-governmental organization for nature conservation, in the Aras Valley at the village Yukarı Çıyrıklı, in the Tuzluca district of Iğdır Province, Turkey. It is one of Turkey's two bird-ringing stations that remain active yearly. Between 2006 and 2021, more than 145,000 birds of 201 species were ringed, and 306 bird species were observed at this station. Sixty-three percent of the 489 bird species found in Turkey are recorded at this wetland, making it eastern Turkey's most species-rich wetland for birds. The number of ringed and observed 306 bird species comprises 90 percent of the 340 bird species in Iğdır Province, the most bird species rich landlocked province of Turkey. Seven new bird species were observed during the bird ringing activities in 2012 alone, including the raptor Shikra, or Little Banded Goshawk (Accipiter badius), which was new to Turkey's avifauna.

A Biology professor at the University of Utah and a president of the KuzeyDoğa Society, Çağan Şekercioğlu, appealed to the Ministry of Forest and Water Management to drop the Tuzluca Dam project, which would destroy the wetland harboring bird wildlife in the Aras Valley. In 2013, the ministry granted the site the highest level of conservation status (Nature Conservation Area).

Gallery

See also

 Armenia–Iran border
 Azerbaijan–Iran border
 Geography of Armenia
 Geography of Azerbaijan
 Geography of Iran
 Geography of Turkey
 Nature of Azerbaijan
 List of rivers of Armenia
 List of lakes of Armenia
 Rivers and lakes in Azerbaijan
 The Maiden Tower water reservoir

Footnotes

International rivers of Asia
Rivers of Turkey
Rivers of Armenia
Rivers of Azerbaijan
Rivers of Iran
Armenia–Iran border
Armenia–Turkey border
National symbols of Armenia
Azerbaijan–Iran border
Azerbaijan–Turkey border
Landforms of Iğdır Province
Landforms of Erzurum Province
Border rivers
Rivers of the Republic of Artsakh